

Seahaven FM
Seahaven FM is the local radio station covering Eastbourne, Lewes, Newhaven, Peacehaven, Polegate and Seaford in East Sussex.

Working from studios in Seaford under an Ofcom Community Radio Licence, on a not-for-profit basis.  The station began broadcasting full-time on 96.3Mhz in January 2011.  Initially covering Newhaven, Seaford and parts of Peacehaven. In 2019 coverage was enhanced improving the signal to the existing area and could also extending it to most of the county town of Lewes.  At the end of November 2020 an extension was approved by Ofcom which enabled the station to cover all of Eastbourne which includes Polegate and Pevensey on 95.6Mhz.

Programming and Music Policy
As of 2020 we are now in the 8th decade where music was specifically made for teenagers, the station's policy is to showcase the best of this music.  Starting in the 1950s with the birth of Rock n' Roll and all the favourites of the 60s, 70s, 80s, 90s, 2000s including the best melodic music of the present day.  Always keen to get in to the community the station and its presenters can be seen from time to time out and about.  Daytime from 6am to 7pm is music based, and in the evenings the station broadcasts a variety of shows from specialist music shows to community-based talk shows enabling local people from all walks of life can have their say. 

The station is run largely by local volunteers and includes a number of former professional radio people.   Norman Baker, the former MP for the Lewes constituency is one of the station's presenters.

History
The station started streaming on the web on 1 Feb 2008 and completed two short-term FM Restricted Service Licence (RSL) broadcasts one in March and the other in August 2008, it also provided facilities for two other RSL broadcasts by other groups. 

In November 2008 Seahaven FM was one of the 48 stations in the South East who took part in the second round of applications to Ofcom for a Community Radio Licence.  The station was successfully awarded the licence in September 2009 and announced it on its streaming service at 09:09 on the 09/09/09. It took a further 16 months to complete the work to launch the station full-time on FM.  The launch took place on Sunday 9 January at 12:00 noon and the full-time schedule started at 7 am on Monday 10 January 2011.

Today
Seahaven FM covers about 40% of the whole of the population of East Sussex and broadcasts along the south coast from Peacehaven to Pevensey bringing a uniquely local radio service to the area.  Created by and for local people working and living in the area.  Entertaining and promoting all that is best about the area which is notable for its temperate climate and high sunshine levels and known locally as the Sunshine Coast.

References

External links
Seahaven FM's Website

Radio stations in Sussex
Community radio stations in the United Kingdom
Seaford, East Sussex